Euriphene tessmanniana is a butterfly in the family Nymphalidae. It is found in Cameroon.

References
Bryk, 1915. Neue exotische, insbesondere aethiopische Schmetterlinge. - Archiv für Naturgeschichte 81(A4)(4):1–16, pl. 1.

Butterflies described in 1915
Euriphene
Endemic fauna of Cameroon
Butterflies of Africa